Lieutenant-Colonel Sir Jacob William Barth CBE (23 July 1871 – 30 May 1941) was a British lawyer who served as the Attorney General of the East Africa Protectorate and Chief Justice of Kenya.

Biography
Barth was born in London, United Kingdom in 1871. He attended Battersea Grammar School and matriculated from Wadham College, Oxford in 1890. Barth was admitted to Middle Temple and called to the bar on 27 June 1900. He served as Attorney General of the East Africa Protectorate between 1914 and 1918. 

In 1920, he was appointed Chief Justice of Kenya and remained in the post until he retired in 1934. 

He was made a Commander of the Order of the British Empire in 1916 and Knight Bachelor in 1922. Barth died in Albury, Surrey in 1941.

See also
 Chief Justice of Kenya
 Attorney General of Kenya

References

1871 births
1941 deaths
20th-century Kenyan judges
Chief justices of Kenya
Attorneys General of Kenya
Alumni of Wadham College, Oxford
People educated at Battersea Grammar School
Commanders of the Order of the British Empire
Alumni of the Inns of Court School of Law
Knights Bachelor
British Kenya people